Spider-Woman (Jessica Drew) is a  character appearing in American comic books published by Marvel Comics. Created by Archie Goodwin and Marie Severin, the character first appeared in Marvel Spotlight #32 (February 1977). 50 issues of an ongoing series titled Spider-Woman followed. At its conclusion, she was killed, and though later resurrected, she fell into disuse, supplanted by other characters using the name Spider-Woman. 

Her origin story relates that she was a brainwashed spy working for HYDRA. Writer Brian Michael Bendis added Spider-Woman to the roster of The New Avengers, which leads to her involvement in the "Secret Invasion" storyline. In 2009, the character received her second self-titled limited series, written by Bendis, which ran for seven issues. As part of the 2014 "Spider-Verse" event, Spider-Woman began her third ongoing series, written by Dennis Hopeless. The series was interrupted by Marvel's 2015 "Secret Wars" event, and ended with issue #10. Spider-Woman was relaunched several months later with a new issue #1, still written by Hopeless, which continued the story from the previous volume.

Jessica Drew has been described as one of Marvel's most notable and powerful female heroes. She will make her cinematic debut in Spider-Man: Across the Spider-Verse, voiced by Issa Rae.

Concept and creation
Marvel Comics' then-publisher Stan Lee said in 1978, shortly after Spider-Woman's debut in Marvel Spotlight #32 (February 1977) and the start of the character's 50-issue, self-titled series (April 1978 - June 1983), that the character originated because

Spider-Woman's origin and basic character were designed by Archie Goodwin, while her visual appearance was designed by freelancer Marie Severin.

Publication history

Original series
Though by most accounts, Spider-Woman was originally intended as a one-off character for the sake of simply establishing trademark, Marvel Spotlight #32 sold unexpectedly well and writer/editor Marv Wolfman was asked to take the character to an ongoing series.

In her first appearance, Spider-Woman was to be an actual spider evolved into a human as imagined by writer/co-creator Goodwin. Her debut was shortly followed by a four-issue story arc in Marvel Two-in-One in which Wolfman presented a different origin retcon as he felt her original origin was too implausible for mid-1970s readers. During this arc and the premiere issue of her own comic, Spider-Woman was identified as the human, Jessica Drew (combining the first name of Wolfman's daughter and the last name of fictional detective Nancy Drew), who had memories of being a spider implanted into her by the terrorist group HYDRA. Her costume was also redesigned for her series so that her long hair was uncovered, becoming a prominent part of the character's appearance.

Wolfman introduced Spider-Woman's mentor Charles Magnus and archenemies Morgan le Fay and the Brothers Grimm. He left the series after issue #8, citing a heavy workload, but later admitted "If truth be told, I never felt comfortable writing her. I never found a handle for her and kept trying until I finally decided to leave the book". Neophyte Mark Gruenwald became the writer, while the series's regular penciler, comics legend Carmine Infantino, remained on board, having developed a fondness for the character and her stories. Gruenwald continued with the macabre themes Wolfman had used, while putting more focus on Drew's struggles to deal with her social awkwardness, shyness, and the negative reactions she produced in nearly everyone she met. The last of these is revealed to be caused by fear-inducing pheromones, a previously unrevealed ability. Gruenwald also introduced outgoing aspiring actress Lindsay McCabe, who became Drew's best friend and the mainstay of her supporting cast.

Marvel had been heavily advertising the series from the start, and during Gruenwald's run an animated TV series began airing. But Roger Stern, who replaced Wolfman as editor, recounted that Spider-Woman had already lost her status as a top seller by this time. Despite her differing origin and powers and Wolfman's deliberate effort to avoid Spider-Man guest appearances or crossovers, readers still tended to see the character as a female Spider-Man. "They saw her, and later the She-Hulk", Stern explained, "as running a good idea into the ground, much as DC had done in the ’60s with its then-ever-growing families of Super- and Bat-characters".

Issue #20 saw the departure of Gruenwald, Infantino, and Stern. New writer Michael Fleisher gave Spider-Woman a career as a bounty hunter, abandoned both the series' macabre tone and outstanding subplots such as Charles Magnus' mysterious disappearance, and replaced them with such superhero standbys as criminal masterminds and a love interest who is enamored with the protagonist's costumed guise but oblivious to her in her civilian identity. Many fans criticized that Fleisher had taken away everything that made the character special. Fleisher would be retained on the series up until #32, after which Chris Claremont, already a big-name writer for his work on Uncanny X-Men, took over and switched Jessica Drew's occupation from bounty hunter to private investigator. Steve Leialoha was drawing the series by this time.

The series had already come under criticism for its rapid turnover of writers, and like all of its writers, Claremont had a fairly short stay on Spider-Woman. After 13 issues, both he and Leialoha were compelled to leave for other projects. Their final issue marked the return of Gruenwald, this time as editor. He was promptly informed that due to dwindling sales, Marvel was canceling the series, and issue #50 would be the last. Gruenwald hired comic book novices Ann Nocenti and Brian Postman as writer and penciler for the final four issues, under the theory that their inexperience in the medium would give them a unique perspective and perhaps take the series out with a bang. Under Gruenwald's direction, the series returned to its macabre roots and resumed the long-abandoned subplot of Magnus's disappearance. The final issue used a photo cover of Marvel staffers (including Gruenwald and Nocenti) in costume as the issue's cast, and had Spider-Woman perish in a climactic battle with her nemesis Morgan le Fay. Nocenti reasoned, "These are licensed characters and you want them to have a forever life. At the same time, they live in a violent world and occasionally you feel like someone has to die, otherwise it’s too unreal".

Readers were outraged at the character being killed, and Nocenti and Gruenwald both came to feel remorse over their decision. Gruenwald took the readers' reaction especially to heart, and became determined to fix what he saw as a major mistake. He and Stern had been paired up again on Avengers, but with their jobs swapped, and he instructed Stern to write a story reviving Drew. Less than a year after her death, Spider-Woman was resurrected in The Avengers #240-241 (Feb.-March 1984).

Decline
For the next four years she was limited to a handful of guest appearances. In 1988, she and Lindsay McCabe joined the supporting cast of Wolverine, appearing through the first 16 issues of the character's series, followed by brief returns in issues #27 and 125-128. She was never depicted in costume during her appearances in Wolverine, sticking with her civilian identity, though she did often use her powers to aid Wolverine.

In 1996, Mark Gruenwald returned to the character with a short back-up feature in Sensational Spider-Man Annual '96. Titled "The Return of Spider-Woman", it put Drew back in costume for the first time in over a decade and ended with a teaser for further Spider-Woman adventures in Spider-Man Team Up. Gruenwald died, however, before these stories could be written, and subsequent appearances treated "The Return of Spider-Woman" as non-canon. In 1999, Drew was again placed in the role of non-costumed supporting character, this time to the third Spider-Woman, Mattie Franklin, for the first 11 issues of Spider-Woman volume 3.

Drew made an appearance in a 2003 story arc in Alias, a series written by Brian Michael Bendis. Bendis would write most of the character's adventures for the next decade.

Revival through New Avengers
In January 2005, The New Avengers was launched, ostensibly with Jessica Drew as a member of the titular supergroup, back in costume as Spider-Woman. Though this Jessica Drew would later be revealed as an imposter, this prominent exposure of the character opened the door for new attention to her original adventures. Firstly, on 21 December 2005, Marvel released the first issue of Spider-Woman: Origin, a five-part miniseries co-written by Brian Michael Bendis and Brian Reed, illustrated by the art team of the Luna Brothers, Jonathan and Joshua Luna. It was largely an extended retelling of Marvel Spotlight #32, though some details were changed.

Secondly, the original Spider-Woman series was reprinted in its entirety, along with Marvel Spotlight #32 and all her contemporaneous guest appearances, in a pair of Essentials trade paperbacks, the first released simultaneously with Spider-Woman: Origin #1, the second in 2007.

In 2009, the "Secret Invasion" storyline introduced the concept that, with the exception of some flashback scenes, all of Jessica Drew's appearances in New Avengers over the past four years were actually made by a Skrull imposter. Writer Bendis said he had this planned since New Avengers #1. 

Following this story, the real Drew supplanted her doppelganger as a regular member of The New Avengers. She was also featured in another solo limited series during this time, which was published both in printed form and as a motion comic. It was written by Bendis with art by Alex Maleev and lasted 7 issues. Following the cancellation of New Avengers, Spider-Woman appeared as a regular character throughout the 2010-2013 Avengers series, from issue #1 (July 2010) through its final issue #34 (January 2013). She appears as a regular character in the 2014 Secret Avengers.

Spider-Verse and a new solo series
In 2014, Jessica was a key player in the Spider-Verse event. Spinning out of that event, a new fifth volume Spider-Woman series was started, written by Dennis Hopeless. In issue #5 the series featured the first redesign of Jessica's costume since it was created in the 1970s. This series was interrupted by Marvel's 2015 Secret Wars event, and ended with issue #10. Spider-Woman Volume 6 was relaunched several months later with a new issue #1, still written by Hopeless and continues the story from the previous volume. Spider-Woman, Gwen Stacy and Silk  were the protagonists of the Spider-Women event. Spider-Woman issues #6 and #7 were the tie-ins. The ongoing was cancelled after 17 issues.

Fictional character biography

Origins
Spider-Woman was born Jessica Miriam Drew, daughter of Jonathan Drew and Merriam Drew, in London, England. At a young age, her family moves to a lab built by her father and Herbert Wyndham near Mount Wundagore in Transia, where she becomes gravely ill from months of uranium exposure. To save her life, her father injects her with an experimental serum based on irradiated spiders' blood. Because the serum requires a month's incubation, Wyndham places her in a genetic accelerator. Shortly after, her mother dies and her father leaves for the United States, leaving Wyndham to care for her. While in the accelerator, she ages at a decelerated rate. When she is finally released, decades later, Drew is only 17 years old.

Drew is ostracized by the other residents of Mount Wundagore, the High Evolutionary's New Men, since she was originally human while they were animals. Because of this, she eventually leaves to seek human civilization. She is captured by a HYDRA reserve unit under Count Otto Vermis's leadership who erases her memories, brainwashes her, and recruits her as a HYDRA agent under the codename Arachne. One of HYDRA's top agents, Jared, is assigned to train her in combat and espionage and to seduce her. Once Jessica has become his lover, he allows himself to be captured by S.H.I.E.L.D. so that she can be goaded into assassinating S.H.I.E.L.D. commander Nick Fury.

While battling Fury, Jessica accidentally kills Jared and learns HYDRA's true nature. She quits HYDRA and assaults the unit's base, sending Count Vermis into a fatal crash, but not before he unlocks memory implants that she was actually an evolved spider and had killed a man before her association with HYDRA. Despondent from these revelations, she wanders the woods where Vermis crashed until being recaptured and hypnotized by HYDRA.

Spider-Woman: Origin
Origin does away with the spider-blood serum and genetic accelerator elements of the character's previous origin story. Instead, Jessica's powers derive from her mother's womb being hit by a laser beam containing the DNA traits of several different species of spiders while she was carrying Jessica (the Drews were trying to splice and harness spiders' environmental adaptive capabilities to graft them into the human genome).<ref name="SWorigin3">Spider-Woman Origin' #3 (April 2006). Marvel Comics.</ref>

After Jessica's parents disappear under mysterious circumstances, Jessica is recruited into HYDRA (under false pretenses), where she is made into a formidable fighter and assassin. She is trained and mentored by Taskmaster, who trains her in many martial disciplines and more than seven different fighting styles out of his own "arsenal".

In this re-telling, Otto Vermis, originally recruiting her into HYDRA, is rather an old, retired HYDRA agent whom Jessica seduces to gain information that will lead her to her father.

In addition, Origin made the following modifications:
 Merriam Drew was now Miriam Drew.
 The Drews moved to Wundagore Mountain prior to Jessica's conception, establishing without a doubt that she was born on the European landmark. Afterwards, she was raised by her nanny Bova (human in appearance), as well as her mother.
 Jessica's father, Jonathan, never found uranium on their land. Instead, their research was funded by HYDRA, and their direct liaison/financier from the group was General Wyndham. It is not clear what connection, if any, he had with Edgar Wyndham (who, in the original Spider-Woman books, was Jonathan's best friend and research partner), nor with the High Evolutionary.
 Jessica's father worked in large part with Miles Warren who later left the project because he felt that there was more potential in experimenting with the cloning of human cells.

Spider-Woman
As Spider-Woman, Jessica Drew is ordered to abduct Alicia Masters vacationing in London. During the resultant conflict with Ben Grimm, she recovers from her brainwashing and joins him in saving Masters. She and Grimm then encounter Modred the Mystic, who removes HYDRA's memory implants and restores her memories.

Jessica moves into an apartment in London, but finds it impossible to get a job due to her complete lack of background and her tendency to inspire dislike and even fear in other people. Following an aborted break-in, she is unmasked by Scotland Yard officer (and S.H.I.E.L.D. agent) Jerry Hunt, who becomes obsessed with her. During this troubled time, she is approached by the mysterious sorcerer Magnus, who offers help. After defending him from Excaliber, who was sent by Morgan Le Fay to recover the Darkhold, he suggests that she relocate with him to Los Angeles. Magnus tutors her in the ways of civilization and informs her that her father was murdered, leading her on a hunt for his killer. She is distracted from this hunt when Morgan Le Fey's ghost again seeks the Darkhold, this time in person. During the battle, Hunt catches up with Jessica and they begin a romantic relationship. With his help, she identifies her father's murderer who dies immediately after confessing.

For the time, Jessica chooses to keep her doings as Spider-Woman a secret. Her relationship with Hunt sours, and following a final battle with the Brothers Grimm, he and Magnus part ways with her. For the next three months, she makes a hand-to-mouth living by working as a receptionist at the Hatros Institute while undergoing group therapy there. Though she ultimately loses the position due to a change in management, during her time there she received medication to suppress her pheromones so that she could exist among other people without producing any unwanted side-effects.  Jessica formed a strong friendship with fellow patient and aspiring actress Lindsay McCabe and developed acquaintances with several other superheroes.

The next few months of Jessica's life are not covered by published stories. During this time, she appears publicly as Spider-Woman, becomes a bounty hunter working in partnership with paraplegic criminologist Scotty McDowell, acquires a full wardrobe of disguises for use in her work, and finds a police liaison in Captain Walsh. This situation lasts for several months. When her working relationship with Scotty fails, Jessica accepts an offer from Lindsay to move into an apartment with her in San Francisco, where she begins a romantic relationship with their landlord David Ishima, and sets up a practice as a licensed private investigator. Her move there allows Lindsay to deduce her secret identity; she is unbothered by the danger involved in being Spider-Woman's friend, and the shared secret deepens the friendship between them.

While working as a private investigator, Jessica battles Morgan once again. Not long after that, she gives up her immunity powers to save Giant-Man. Her relationship with David Ishima develops to the point where she reveals her Spider-Woman identity to him, only to have him break up with her because he wants to be with an ordinary woman.

Jessica travels in astral form with Magnus to 6th century England to free her friends' souls in a showdown with Morgan le Fey in the 6th century. She manages to vanquish Morgan, but her human body dies while her spirit was gone. At her request, Magnus places a spell over humanity to remove all memory of Jessica's existence. This spell is faulty, however; when Tigra and the Shroud discover Jessica's dead body, they contact the Avengers and Doctor Strange. The Avengers and Strange travel to the astral plane to battle Morgan Le Fay, who was trying to claim Jessica's body so she could return to the physical realm. Eventually, Doctor Strange and Magnus reunite Jessica's spirit with her human body, though Magnus's life and Jessica's powers are sacrificed to do so. She thus abandons her Spider-Woman identity and continues her life as a private investigator in San Francisco, assisted by Lindsay McCabe and, for a time, by Tigra.

Jessica and Lindsay take a job delivering the Black Blade to Japan, but while passing through Madripoor, she is enchanted by the blade. By this time, her superhuman strength and agility, and ability to cling to walls have returned. She is freed from the blade's power by Lindsay and an underworld figure called Patch, whom she immediately recognizes as the X-Man Wolverine. Following the incident, she and Lindsay set up new business lodgings in Madripoor, with Patch as a frequent ally and information source.

Jessica Drew's life settles down until Charlotte Witter, a villainess going by the Spider-Woman name, steals her powers and leaves her near death. Jessica is taken from the hospital to New York City by Madame Web who directs her and Mattie Franklin (yet another woman who has assumed the Spider-Woman name) to track down Witter. Under Madame Web's guidance, Franklin absorbs from Witter the powers of all four Spider-Women. Afterwards, Jessica remains with Madame Web for a time, helping her to watch over Mattie. Jessica's powers gradually return to her during this time, but are now unreliable, failing her unexpectedly on occasion.

For untold reasons, Jessica moves back to San Francisco, resuming her private investigator practice there. When she hears that Mattie Franklin has gone missing, she goes to New York to find her. With the help of local P.I. Jessica Jones, she rescues Mattie from a drug dealer who had abducted her and was cannibalizing her tissue to make the Mutant Growth Hormone.

Secret Invasion
One day, a HYDRA agent known as Connely offers her powers back if she would rejoin S.H.I.E.L.D. as a double agent. Knowing Connely would kill her if she says no, Jessica Drew contacts Nick Fury who confronts her securely and urges her to accept the offer. He tells Jessica that he will feed her limited info until S.H.I.E.L.D. can analyze the HYDRA cell and then use the info to take it down. The HYDRA cell is in fact a team of Skrulls who made the offer as a trap to abduct Drew, so that their current Queen Veranke could take her place in the New Avengers and assume her role as Fury's spy in preparation for the upcoming invasion.

After the invasion is repulsed, Tony Stark finds a Skrull ship in orbit with all the replaced heroes, including Drew.

Avenger and agent of S.W.O.R.D.
Jessica Drew joins the New Avengers, claiming she has nowhere else to go. She also joins the Lady Liberators along with the Invisible Woman, Storm, Valkyrie, Thundra, Tigra, Black Widow, She-Hulk and Hellcat who are trying to discover the identity of the Red Hulk. Alongside her work with the Avengers, Jessica Drew joins S.W.O.R.D., under an invitation by Abigail Brand. Her membership in the organization takes her on a number of missions eliminating hostile aliens operating on Earth.

Before the Siege of Asgard, Ronin attempts to assassinate Norman Osborn but is captured by the Dark Avengers. Jessica Drew teams up with Ms. Marvel, Mockingbird and Jessica Jones to rescue him. After he is saved, the New Avengers relocate to a safehouse in Brooklyn where they meet up with Steve Rogers.

Jessica is then paired with Spider-Man to do reconnaissance on Avengers Tower, where she reveals to him she is an agent of S.W.O.R.D. The duo are then found by Mandrill and Griffin who proceed to attack them. During the fight Mandrill gets close enough to Jessica and controls her into attacking Spider-Man. Spider-Man appears to be on the losing end of the fight but manages to lure Jessica away from Mandrill and the effects of his control begin to wear off. The duo trick Mandrill and Griffin into thinking Jessica has beaten Spider-Man and when they approach Spider-Woman to give her new commands, Jessica punches Mandrill in the face and shoves her hand in his mouth, firing off a venom blast and knocking him out. Furious, Jessica wants to kill both villains for what they have done but is stopped by Spider-Man. The duo heads back to the safehouse where they head off with the Avengers to help the Asgardians. Upon arriving in Asgard, Jessica and the rest of the heroes engage Iron Patriot's forces and witnesses the insane Sentry's defeat.

Jessica is asked by Steve Rogers himself to join his team of Avengers. During their first meeting, Jessica expresses her doubts to Wolverine about being on the team, feeling she has not earned the role. Wolverine advises her if she feels that way, she will then have to work towards earning it then. Suddenly Kang the Conqueror appears in the middle of the meeting with a dire warning about the future and all of reality, blaming the children of the Avengers. After recruiting the Protector and building a time machine, the time machine is destroyed by a furious Wonder Man. Once the dust has settled, an alternate version of Apocalypse and his Four Horsemen appear. After Apocalypse's defeat, Jessica and a few of her teammates are sent into New York City to protect its citizens from the attacks coming from the timestream. While in Washington Square Park, they come across Killraven and join forces to help the citizens. Once their mission is completed and all the attacks have stopped, Jessica is the first to realize Killraven has not been returned to his proper future.

Later Jessica is present when Red Hulk comes to warn the Avengers that the Hood is seeking to collect the Infinity Gems. She is present along with the rest of the Avengers when they confront the Illuminati in Attilan about their existence and goes with a team of Avengers to the ruins of the Xavier Institute to get to Professor Xavier's Infinity gem.

During the "Fear Itself" storyline, Spider-Woman, Ms. Marvel and Protector arrive in Brazil to help Red She-Hulk fight Hulk, who was transformed into Nul: Breaker of Worlds.

While on a mission for S.W.O.R.D., Jessica is sent to locate an unusual alien energy surge in Wakanda. Upon finding the remains of a Spaceknight, Jessica is ambushed by the Intelligencia who take her as a prisoner. Abigail Brand approaches the Avengers for help and a team is put together to help locate Jessica. Jessica wakes up naked and is interrogated by two members of the Intelligencia. While the Intelligencia study the Spaceknight, the Avengers interrupt their attempts and the body activates, revealing it was containing Ultron's consciousness. The new Ultron escapes and Jessica is reunited with the Avengers.

Jessica Drew becomes a member of the new Secret Avengers.

Spider-Verse and Post-Avenger life
During the "Spider-Verse" storyline, Spider-Woman joins Spider-Girl and Spider-Man 2099 in confronting Spider-Man about Spider-Man 2099 witnessing his counterpart being killed by Morlun. She is among the spider-themed superheroes brought to Earth-13 by Spider-UK, Spider-Girl of Earth-982, and Spider-Ham, to form a resistance against Morlun and his family, the Inheritors.  When the resistance was visiting Earth-928 and encountered a past version of Superior Spider-Man (Doctor Octopus' mind in Peter Parker's body) with his own army, they attracted the attention of the Inheritors. Spider-Woman followed Silk with Spider-Man Noir to an unknown reality where they were being tracked by the Inheritors Brix and Bora. Spider-Man Noir was wounded and the trio escaped to his home world to allow him to recover from his injuries. After this, she was sent by Spider-Man to the Loomworld, home of the Inheritors to gather more information on the Inheritors. After encountering and replacing her doppelganger from Loomworld, who was Morlun's lover, she was able to gather intelligence in regards to the Master Weaver and his role in the conflict, which helped the Spider Army ultimately win the battle against the Inheritors.

After the battle with the Inheritors, Jessica decided to quit the Avengers in order to start a new life and to focus on helping ordinary civilians. Jessica decides to help common people solve crimes, and enlists Ben Urich and Roger Gocking, the Porcupine.

Secret Wars

Knowing the universe will end soon, Reed Richards and Susan Storm choose Jessica and Natasha Romanoff to copilot a ship that will contain a handpicked few to restart humanity and escape the destruction of the universe. Their ship is shot down when the Children of Tomorrow from the Ultimate Universe invade, and she and the ship's passengers are killed in the ensuing explosion. This timeline and the resulting deaths were later undone.

Post-Secret Wars
In the debut issue of the new volume set after the Secret Wars, Jessica is in the second trimester of pregnancy and still works as a private investigator. Although there were various debates about the father's identity, after the baby's birth, Jessica admitted that, while she had been in a relationship over nine months ago that started her interest in a family, the man left before she could bring it up directly, prompting her to go to a sperm bank instead. She eventually gives birth to a son whom she names Gerry. Gerry also inherited her power set. After Porcupine is nearly killed by the Hobgoblin, Jessica and Roger fall in love and start dating while continuing to raise Gerry.

During the "Secret Empire" storyline, Spider-Woman is among the heroes that are trapped in the Darkforce dome that surrounds Manhattan following a fight with Hydra's Army of Evil. Spider-Woman was attracted to a signal flare fired by Jennie Sheldon and J. Jonah Jameson as she saves them from Kraven the Hunter. Jennie Sheldon took pictures of the fight. She, along with Ben Urich and the Kingpin, also helped Doctor Strange reclaim his Sanctum Santorum from Baron Mordo, who had also captured Daredevil, Iron Fist, Luke Cage and Cloak.

During the "Spider-Geddon" storyline, Spider-Woman comes together with the Spider-Army again as she is part of Kaine Parker's group on their mission to claim the crystal containing Solus' lifeforce before Verna claims it. She was able to escape with it during the fight with Verna and the Hounds. Spider-Woman makes it back to Earth-616 where she has the crystal. Unfortunately, she arrived at New U Technologies where she is grabbed by Jennix. After being hit by Spider-Woman's venom blasts, Jennix instructs Daemos to share his food with Brix and Bora. As Daemos starts to feed off of Spider-Woman, she states that she got her powers from a radiation blast which Daemos notices the radiation in her lifeforce. Jennix has a change of plans and instructs Daemos to place Spider-Woman in stasis so that Jennix can study her later. Right now, Jennix places the crystal in the cloning machine enabling Solus to live again. In the end, the Spider-Army manages to free Jessica and defeat the Inheritors, by using the cloning technologies to revert them into babies.

During the "Empyre" storyline, Spider-Woman is recruited to Captain Marvel's personal Accuser Corps and receives a copy of the Universal Weapon that was made by Doctor Strange.

Powers and abilities

After her mother, pregnant with Jessica, was struck with a beam of radiation containing the DNA of several different types of spiders, Jessica Drew developed superhuman powers patterned after several different types of spiders when she was born. Jessica is super-humanly strong and is able to lift around seven tons at her peak. She also possesses superhuman speed, stamina, agility, and reflexes. Jessica's body is more resistant to injury than an ordinary person's, allowing her to take far more physical punishment compared to the average human. Jessica also possesses superhuman hearing and smell, the latter of which allowed her to distinguish a life-model decoy from the real Nick Fury. Jessica's palms and soles secrete a special fluid that allows her to cling to solid objects, like a true spider. Jessica's physical makeup also makes her highly resistant to all terrestrial poisons, toxins, and completely immune to radiation. While she is typically rendered dizzy by the initial dose, she is completely immune to it after being exposed again. She also exudes a high concentration of pheromones that elicit pleasure and attraction from others, depending on unknown factors which might include gender and mood, although she typically uses a chemical "perfume" that renders these pheromones inert. This ability appears to be passive. Jessica's body also produces an inordinate amount of bio-electrical energy which she can discharge from her hands. She refers to these discharges as "venom blasts," although they actually have nothing to do with poison and typically cause pain and unconsciousness. Jessica can kill a person in the same way that a lightning bolt would and can pierce solid metals like steel by using her blasts at their greatest intensity. Jessica was also able to glide through unknown means using the web-like extensions of her costume but she seems to have gained the ability to fly after being replaced by the Skrull Queen, Veranke. Jessica has lost her powers in numerous ways and on several occasions, but after returning to Earth at the end of the Secret Invasion, Jessica's powers were restored and are greater than ever.

In addition to her powers, she is a superb hand-to-hand combat fighter, and has trained in several styles of fighting including Boxing, Capoeira, Judo, Karate and Tai chi, learned under the training of the Taskmaster. She has also had training in fencing and the use of many other weapons. Jessica was trained by HYDRA (and later on by S.H.I.E.L.D.) in covert operations, stealth, espionage, and information gathering and is a superb athlete. She speaks several foreign languages, including Korean, Russian, French, Spanish, Portuguese, and German. Jessica has also received vocational training in undercover detective work and sometimes carries a Walther PPK handgun.

 Cultural impact and legacy 

 Critical reception 
James Whitbrook of Gizmodo referred to Jessica Drew as one of the "greatest Spider-Women of all time," writing, "There could only be one at the top of the list, and it’s the one that really started it all. Created in a quick rush so Marvel could squat on the name to avoid rivals capitalizing on Spider-Man’s success, Jessica Drew’s story as Spider-Woman has seen her grow into a role and character that makes her so much more than the “female Spider-Man” her name might imply. Hell, she’s always been her own damn hero—over the years since her debut, Jessica has been a super spy, an Agent of SHIELD, an Avenger, a private investigator, and many other things, but most importantly, she’s never been in Peter Parker’s shadow, willingly far removed from the world of Spiders to do her own thing. She’s always been a kickass, witty hero that’s every-bit deserving of Spider-praise as her distant friend Peter." IGN called Jessica Drew one of the "greatest Avengers of all time," saying, "after living a life full of subterfuge, murder, and entanglements with the terrorist group H.Y.D.R.A., Jessica Drew joined up with the New Avengers during the super villain breakout at the Raft. Ever a controversial member because of her mother (she runs HYDRA), she must constantly deal with the judgment of her teammates (they don't trust her). To make matters worse, during the event Secret Invasion an Earth-shattering twist revealed that the Skrull Queen Veranke had been impersonating her since New Avengers #1. Luck has often not been on Drew's side, but she has proven her ability to rise above adversity and be every bit a hero as the next member. She is not the only member with a soiled reputation; in fact, she is currently romantically involved with the bad boy of the Avengers, Hawkeye. Her super strength and agility combined with her Venom Blast stunning ability make her a formidable opponent, and her personality adds a refreshing lightness to the team." Chase Magnett of Comicbook.com described Jessica Drew as a "classic character," stating, "Spider-Woman's new costume replaces a skintight spandex suit from the 70's with a more wearable look including a customized leather jacket. This superficial adjustment reflects a much deeper change to the character. It has been decades since Jessica Drew was featured in an ongoing solo title (Spider-Woman: Agent of SWORD was originally planned as an ongoing in 2009, but altered to a mini-series) and Spider-Woman #5 is concerned primarily with defining her without the Avengers or a team-up. Spider-Woman is striking out from her previous affiliations in order to "try living a normal life". Normal is a relative concept though, and it appears that working as an urban crimefighter and investigator may be as close as it comes. Rodriguez's gorgeous new costume design is not the only part of Spider-Woman that looks great. He toys with panel compositions and sound effects in such a way as to make the entire reading experience a joy. He is a comics craftsman with a style that is still entirely his own. Just like Jessica Drew he is showing off the flexibility and potential of someone who has been involved in superhero comics for many years. [...] Spider-characters like Silk, Spider-Gwen, and Spider-Woman are filling the gap left behind by a grown-up Peter Parker; they're also more reflective of the readers who are interested in comics and superheroes. There's still a place for Spider-Man and his classic friends like The Human Torch and Daredevil, but there are more opportunities new heroes to join them. All of these women and other new characters like Ms. Marvel and the All-New Ghost Rider represent a new wave of superheroes. They are following in the footsteps of Spider-Man: a hero of the people who reflects our own concerns and worries (while going on fantastic adventures). And as time goes on they are reflecting the men and women who love those adventures better every year." Abdul R. Siddiqui of Mic stated, "Critics love to argue that comics follow the traditional extremes of either portraying a damsel in distress or a femme fatale. However, if they were to actually study many of the prominent characters, they would see just how false this notion is. The best example to argue against such criticisms would be the role of Spider-Woman in Agent of S.W.O.R.D. In terms of portrayal, protagonist Jessica Drew neither dons the virtuous garb of the diminutive, shy lady in waiting nor the leather-clad battle armor of the fighting vixen. Instead, the protagonist spends much of the series in loose trench coats or wife beater shirts more suited to a cage fighter than an attractive woman. At numerous points, she is shown bloodied and beaten to an inch of her life. Certainly, the portrayal does not make her physically beautiful but there is an abstract allure. Also, in terms of characterization, she is neither entirely pure of heart nor is she the conniving type that so strangely fascinates men in power. Instead, she is a woman whose drive for revenge actually demonstrates deep-seated fears of loneliness and betrayal. Even the motion comic picks a voice actress whose take on the character is in no way sultry, yet it is strangely unique and filled with emotion. Therefore, it is safe to say that no traditional criticism of the unrealistic standards or insulting portrayal of women in comics applies to this character and she can therefore not be called a sexist caricature. Instead, she is an individual with so much depth beyond that material that she instead represents ideals. Plus, keep in mind that she also has the ability to control the men around her through pheromones she secretes from her body, once again demonstrating the Petrarchan desire for the female to rule the man who finds her beautiful." 

Kath Leroy of CBR.com referred to Jessica Drew as an "iconic superheroine," saying, "Marvel Comics has a very long tradition and during its decades of existence, they created hundreds of memorable stories, superheroes, and villains. One of the most popular Marvel superheroes is Spider-Man but he's not the only person with this set of powers, not by a long shot. There's also Spider-Woman. Multiple women have held this name but Jessica Drew is the most famous of them all. It will hardly come as a surprise she teamed up with Spider-Man on more than one occasion but she has a lot of going on in her life. Many fans like the courageous Spider-Woman and created amazing fan arts of her. Jessica Drew clearly knows where she stands, and it's not on the side of evil. Again, she might not be as famous as Spider-Man but that doesn't make her any less formidable, and it also doesn't mean she should be underestimated. Spider-Woman is very well able to protect those she cares about, whether it's the people around her, or the city she lives in." Joshua Isaak of Screen Rant described Jessica Drew as a "beloved fan-favorite," stating, "The superhero is unique among others within the Marvel Universe; Jessica Drew has a network of friends who know her true identity, she's a single mother, and her book routinely break the fourth wall without a Deadpool-like awareness of the medium or the reader. [...] Outside of the Skrull Veranke, Drew's most famous foes are enemies that already belong to other franchises, such as Juggernaut, the Enchantress and Madame Hydra. Others such as the Brothers Grimm are shadows of their former selves. This is perhaps why Drew is not as popular as her male counterpart. Spider-Woman is an excellent character cursed with a subpar rogues gallery and casual fans assuming a relationship with Spider-Man (as Drew herself reminds everyone, the two have different powers and aren't related except in name). Spider-Woman's villains have the right idea in attacking their enemy together, perhaps because they believe they won't be recognized alone." Stephanie Williams of Syfy said, "Behind every great woman is an even greater friend. In the case of Carol Danvers, this friend is none other than Jessica Drew. Their friendship isn’t at all one-sided, however. Jessica is great in her own right and Carol is right behind her when she needs the support. Spider-Woman and Captain Marvel are two women who were brought together by dire circumstances but instead of remaining stagnant in misery, a beautiful life-long friendship blossomed from their unthinkable pain. [...] Jessica or Carol are perfect superheroines, but their love for another regardless of each of their own shortcomings is a great reflection of their loving friendship. Hopefully, we continue to get much more bestie action from Jessica and Carol in the future. Superheroes make a job out of being there for those in need, but they can always use people in their corner for support as well. It's always refreshing to see them be there for one another." Anthony Orlando of BuzzFeed stated, "Jessica Drew, aka Spider-Woman, has yet to receive the big-screen treatment she deserves. Though her origins have experienced confusing changes over the years, the main story is that she was given her superpowers before she was born and was recruited into HYDRA, fighting for the group until she discovered its true nature. Her character has recently grown more popular, and she has become a prominent member of the Avengers, making her an ideal new addition to the MCU or Sony's Spider-Verse." 

Ryan Scott of SlashFilm wrote, "With the MCU showing absolutely no signs of slowing down, we recently decided to poll some fans to determine which superhero they would most like to see join the MCU down the line. While there are many options, one hero stood well above the rest of the competition, and it is a wish that may well come true down the line, if the stars align. Coming out on top of those we polled was Spider-Woman, with just over 32% of the vote. Jasmine Shanelle of The Mary Sue asserted, "In all the Spidey reboots out there, we’ve never been blessed with a film surrounding Spider-Woman. Sure, we got a glimpse of Gwen Stacy’s Spider-Woman in an alternate universe from Spider-Man: Into the Spider-Verse, and while that movie was one of the best Spider-Man films we’ve been given, it was still ultimately just that—a Spider-Man film. Introducing Jessica Drew’s Spider-Woman is just the shake-up the MCU needs. Not only does Drew have the same powers as Peter Parker’s Spider-Man, but she’s also a super spy and private investigator. Think Natasha Romanoff’s Black Widow meets Jessica Jones. Drew is as strong as her male counterpart, but tactically and intellectually superior." Mark Peters of Salon.com said, "Since Marvel is now sharing Spider-Man with Sony, presumably Spider-Woman is available too. She’s a character who’s been an Avenger more often than Spider-Man in the comics, and she’s extremely powerful, thanks to her venom blasts. She’s also recently been pregnant—a rare status for a superhero. I doubt that condition would make it to the big screen, but Jessica Drew should."  Rosie Knight of Nerdist stated, "The O.G. Spider-Woman, Jessica Drew, was first introduced in 1977’s Marvel Spotlight #32. She was invented simply to make sure that no one else took the moniker first, but after her popularity surprised Marvel she was given an ongoing series. Jessica has an interesting origin as she was originally written as a woman who evolved from a literal spider, but that was retconned within five issues, and in current continuity she’s actually a clone of Peter Parker. Her iconic red and yellow costume, flowing hair, and her own animated series have made her a fan favorite and most likely to be the first Spider-Woman to appear on screen! So if you’re looking for a place to get to know her, the 2015 Spider-Woman series by Dennis Hopeless and Javier Rodriguez is a great place to start."
 Accolades 

 In 2009, IGN included Jessica Drew in their "Marvel's Femme Fatales" list.
 In 2011, Comics Buyer's Guide ranked Jessica Drew 54th in their "100 Sexiest Women in Comics" list.
 In 2012, IGN ranked Jessica Drew 20th in their "Top 50 Avengers" list.
 In 2013, Den of Geek included Jessica Drew in their "5 Female Marvel Superheroes Who Need Solo Films" list.
 In 2014, Comicbook.com ranked Jessica Drew's Ultimate Marvel iteration 3rd in their "7 Best Female Characters from the Spider-Man Multiverse" list.
 In 2015, Gizmodo ranked Jessica Drew 22th in their "Every Member Of The Avengers" list.
 In 2015, Entertainment Weekly ranked Jessica Drew 25th in their "Let's rank every Avenger ever" list.
 In 2015, CNET included Jessica Drew in their "15 most powerful female superheroes" list.
 In 2015, BuzzFeed ranked Jessica Drew 16th in their "84 Avengers Members Ranked From Worst To Best" list.
 In 2016, Comicbook.com included Jessica Drew in their "7 Big Marvel Superheroes Who Haven't Appeared on Film" list.
 In 2017, Gizmodo ranked Jessica Drew 1st in their "Greatest Spider-Women of All Time" list.
 In 2017, Nerdist ranked Jessica Drew 3rd in their "7 Best Spider-Heroes Who Aren't Peter Parker" list.
 In 2017, Screen Rant ranked Jessica Drew 9th in their "28 Marvel Superheroes With Spider-Powers" list.
 In 2018, WhatCulture ranked Jessica Drew and Carol Danvers 4th in their "7 Best Friendships In Marvel Comics" list.
 In 2019, CBR.com ranked Jessica Drew 9th in their "10 Best Street Level Heroes" list.
 In 2019, Screen Rant ranked Jessica Drew 12th in their "15 Strongest Female Marvel Characters" list.
 In 2020, CBR.com ranked Jessica Drew 4th in their "Spider-Woman: 10 Most Powerful Characters To Bear The Name" list, 5th in their "10 Best Detectives In Marvel Comics" list, and 9th in their "10 Deadliest Female Assassins Of The Marvel Universe" list.
 In 2020, Scary Mommy included Jessica Drew in their "Looking For A Role Model? These 195+ Marvel Female Characters Are Truly Heroic" list.
 In 2021, Screen Rant ranked Jessica Drew and Carol Danvers 9th in their "10 Best Friendships In The Avengers Comic Books" list.
 In 2021, CBR.com ranked Jessica Drew 12th in their "20 Most Powerful Female Members Of The Avengers" list.
 In 2022, Collider included Jessica Drew in their "Spider-Gwen's 10 Best Allies In The Comics" list.
 In 2022, Screen Rant ranked Jessica Drew 7th in their "10 Most Powerful Members Of The Lady Liberators" list and included her in their "10 Best Street-Level Heroes In Marvel Comics" list, and in their "10 Female Marvel Heroes That Should Come To The MCU" list.

 Literary reception 

 Volumes 

 Spider-Woman - 2009 
According to Marvel Comics, Spider-Woman #1 sold out in September 2009. According to Diamond Comics Distributors, Spider-Woman #1 was the 45th best selling comic book in September 2009.

Nick Winstead of Comicbook.com called Spider-Woman #1 "much-anticipated," stating, "This first issue is the first opportunity we've been allowed to see Jessica's deepest thoughts and feelings on her situation, and coupled with the scenes of quiet introspection are some very darkly drawn panels from Maleev, accenting the loneliness and self-imposed exile in which Drew currently finds herself. Brand's approach to her about taking the job as a sort of "alien hunter" is an intriguing new direction for her, given that her first solo series in the 1980's dealt so much with magical foes, mystery solving and encounters with costumed criminals. Brand's offer sparks Drew to take off to, of course, Madripoor, the epicenter of shady characters and criminals in the Marvel universe. [...] This first issue jumps out to an impressive start, and the pacing is quick and immediate, with the reader able to be engaged throughout. Maleev's art is the perfect compliment to the narrative, and there's a great amount of tension in what Drew tells us about her current life. Perhaps her new journey will reinspire her to carve out her destiny and identity, free of any other organization's machinery." Bryan Joel of IGN gave Spider-Woman #1 a grade of 8.2 out of 10, writing, "Spider-Woman is no doubt going to gain footnote status for spearheading Marvel's motion comics initiative. But what shouldn't be forgotten about the series in ten years' time is that its first issue is surprisingly good. Brian Michael Bendis bucks his own trend of decompression in this issue, and this issue shows Spider-Woman has a good deal on its plate. The book details Jessica Drew's mental status post-Secret Invasion, a run-in with Abigail Brand and subsequent drafting into S.W.O.R.D., and deployment on her first official mission. Bendis covers a lot of ground here, even finding time to give a quick refresher on Jessica's origin along the way. It bears mentioning that the issue is well-paced, and gives each plot beat and development room to do its thing. [...] Spider-Woman is off to a strong start. There's certainly room for improvement, but it's nice to know Jessica Drew isn't the next in the string of properties Marvel has given an ongoing series with minimal direction or reason."

 Spider-Woman - 2014 
According to Diamond Comics Distributors, Spider-Woman #1 was the 5th best selling comic book in November 2014. Spider-Woman #1 was the 45th best selling comic book in 2014.

Chase Magnett of Comicbook.com gave Spider-Woman #1 a grade of C, asserting, "Spider-Woman #1 is an issue that starts with its hands tied behind its back. It never has an opportunity to introduce its characters or premise because it's too busy attempting to catch up with an event. However, Hopeless does an admirable job of providing a reason to care about these characters. Land's negligible contribution doesn't actively harm the story, but fails to take advantage of the ample opportunities here. Spider-Woman holds potential, but has a lot of hurdles to overcome in order to develop its own personality and appearance." Jeff Lake of IGN gave Spider-Woman #1 a grade of 5 out of 10, saying, "Spider-Woman was already facing an uphill battle, the book's infamous "butt cover" and oddly time dependent release casting a shadow over Jessica Drew's long awaited return. Those hoping that the debut itself would alleviate such negative connotations are sure to be left disappointed, as Spider-Woman's new #1 proves uneven and ill-formed, serving as little more than a drawn out tie-in to the ongoing events of Spider-Verse. [...] When all is said and done, Spider-Woman #1 isn’t a true debut. As a direct tie-in to Spider-Verse it's a decent enough addition, offering Spider-folk aplenty, but if you're looking for an immersive look at a returning fan favorite, this isn't it. The book's last second shift may serve to rectify some of these aforementioned misgivings, but unless you're a lover of all things Spider-Verse, the book's current direction leaves much to be desired. Whether felled by undue expectation or confusing marketing, Spider-Woman #1 feels more like an ensemble piece than a true solo debut. Fans of the Spider-Verse event will likely find more to like, but for those excited to see Jessica Drew return to prominence, it appears we have more waiting to do yet."

 Spider-Woman - 2015 
According to Diamond Comics Distributors, Spider-Woman #1 was the 37th best selling comic book in November 2015.

Chase Magnett of Comicbook.com gave Spider-Woman #1 a grade of B+, asserting, "A lot of people are going to get hung up on one aspect of Spider-Woman #1: Jessica Drew's pregnancy. It's the topic that has dominated the discussion leading up to the release of this comic and it is a significant part of the comics. Focusing purely, or even largely, on that one aspect does a disservice to the comic though. Spider-Woman #1 is a story about a woman handling her first pregnancy, but it is so much more. It is a story about friends helping one another, about altering one's career, about comedic party shenanigans, and about wild, space adventures. Spider-Woman #1 is one of the most colorful stories in the All-New, All-Different Marvel, a beautifully presented joy of a read. [...] Spider-Woman #1 is one of the absolute best debuts of the All-New, All-Different Marvel line. It is an example of what a team of excellent creators can do when collaborating on a story and craft they clearly care about. The pregnancy storyline is handled very well here, but it speaks volumes about the quality of this comic that it is far from the only thing with discussing. There's a lot of great things happening in Spider-Woman, and it would be a shame for superhero fans to miss out on any of them." Jesse Schedeen of IGN gave Spider-Woman #1 a grade of 8.6 out of 10, writing, "It's nice (if not terribly surprising) to see that Rodriguez is able to juggle the outlandish on down-to-earth elements so well. The story is laid back at times and outlandish at others, and Rodriguez brings a unified look to it all. Rodriguez's page layouts stand out thanks to their variety and strong sense of design. At times he relies on smaller, grid-like layouts, while at other times the page opens up and allows Rodriguez's elegant figure-work to breathe. Rodriguez also colors this issue, and his vibrant hues do a lot to enhance the story. Whether it's the moody glow of a fire in the early pages or the eclectic hues seen in the final sequence, Rodriguez's work leaves a strong impression. Granted, the cover is a little wonky in terms Jessica's posture and proportions, but generally the figure work is much stronger inside the comic. The only thing new about this series is the status quo. But considering how little time we got to savor Dennis Hopeless and Javier Rodriguez's Spider-Woman before Secret Wars cut things short, and changes to the creative team would be a disappointment. This first issue makes the most of the book's core character dynamics as Jessica grapples with her new life as a superhero mother-to-be. This issue even opens up her world to bigger and crazier conflicts again, promising an exciting road ahead for Spider-Woman."

 Spider-Woman - 2020 
According to Diamond Comics Distributors, Spider-Woman #1 was the best selling comic book in March 2020.

Joe Grunenwald of ComicsBeat stated, This series marks her first ongoing work for Marvel, and the two tales in this issue display Pacheco’s deft ear for dialogue and a skill for characterization. Jess narrates both stories, and newcomers to the character will really get a sense of who she is as a result. The first story is nearly all action, while the second is more dialogue-heavy and character-driven, and Pacheco’s scripting on both of them is clever and solidly entertaining. The visuals in this issue are equally strong. Pere Pérez illustrates the opening, more action-oriented tale, and he does so wonderfully. His action is dynamic and easy to follow, and his facial expressions are also spot-on, driving home the humor and the intensity of Pacheco’s script. The issue’s second story, illustrated by Paulo Siqueira and Oren Junior, is just as well-done, with clean lines and interesting page layouts keeping the dialogue-heavier story visually interesting. Colors by Frank D’Armata unify both stories, and he noticeably adjusts his work to match each artist/art team to great effect. The result is a visually-cohesive package that’s a pleasure to take in. [...] Spider-Woman #1 is an engaging and entertaining debut issue for the series. It raises several questions I’m interested in getting answers for, and it sets up Jessica Drew’s new goings-on in a way that’s clever, and that enhances the reading experience. This is worth checking out. Final Verdict: BUY this book if you like solid writing and art that tells an intriguing story with a fan-favorite character." Matthew Aguilar of Comicbook.com gave Spider-Woman #1 a grade of 5 out of 5, saying, "Spider-Woman's new series is finally here and it absolutely delivers. We've never seen a take on Spider-Woman quite like this, and we mean that in the best possible way. Writer Karla Pacheco brings Drew's trademark banter to the series in spades but gives it all some welcome edge, like say when she uses a jerky kid as an impromptu projectile in the middle of a fight. Spider-Woman is also made to look like the true badass she is thanks to Pere Perez and Frank D'Armata, who find inventive ways to showcase her power set throughout the issue. It should also be said that the new costume looks pretty slick in their capable hands, though we also have to mention the second story explaining the new suit. The story itself is great, providing proper context for the new suit and a compelling hook along with it, but the cheesecake style art here is going to be too much for some, looking way out of proportion to the version earlier in the book. That aside, this is one hell of a debut, and Spider-Woman couldn't be in better hands."

Other versions
Age of X
In the Age of X reality, Jessica Drew is a member of the Avengers, mutant hunters who answer to General Frank Castle. Going by the codename Redback, Jessica is one of America's top killers and has been for eight years. She uses lethal force during fights and has never uttered a word, she uses hisses to communicate on occasion. She finally sacrifices herself using a gauntlet from the now-deceased Iron Man to stop the Hulk from destroying a mutant sanctuary with a chemical bomb, having come to recognize that their persecution of mutants is wrong.

Earth-65
During the 2016 Spider-Women event, Spider-Gwen's interdimensional transporter is stolen by Jessica's male Earth-65 counterpart, Jesse Drew. In this universe, Jesse is married with a son and daughter who are unaware he is actually Agent 77 of the criminal organization S.I.L.K. Jesse's backstory is discovered by Gwen while searching files stolen by Cindy Moon's Earth-65 doppelgänger. It is revealed he is the son of two S.H.I.E.L.D. astronaut spies who had been sent to the moon to live on a secret base for ten years, during which they gave birth to Jesse. However, Jesse's father was a Russian double agent who is eventually killed by Jesse's mother. 

Joining S.H.I.E.L.D. after high school, Jesse is sent back to the moon to renovate the base where he and his crew were attacked by alien spider creatures. Jesse escapes, but the spider's saliva poisons his blood and turning it into black goo. He is saved by the head of S.I.L.K., Cindy Moon, who uses her spider formula to fix his blood and grant him spider powers. She deceives Jesse into thinking he needs two doses of the formula a day to survive, but it is discovered by Gwen that he is already cured and the doses are just maintaining his superhuman powers. After learning of this, he quits S.I.L.K. and escapes the state with his family, but not before he aids the three Spider-Women by giving them access codes to Earth-65 Cindy's home base.

Marvel Adventures Spider-Man
In this version, Jessica Drew appeared in issue 52 and is a freelance agent who arrived at Peter's school as a substitute teacher when she discovered Peter's biology report mixed up with HYDRA's bio-weapons plan. She is one of the few people who knew Peter's secret identity.

Marvel Zombies
Spider-Woman is seen on the S.H.I.E.L.D. Helicarrier after the beginning of the zombie infection. She fights alongside the other uninfected heroes but is eventually infected herself. She is then seen in Ultimate Fantastic Four #23 along with the other zombies.

MC2
In the MC2 reality, Jessica does not regain her powers after losing them. She marries and has a child Gerald (or Gerry for short). She learns that her radioactive blood caused Gerry to develop a crippling illness. She attempts to use the same genetic treatments her father gave her to save him. As Gerry "incubated" in a genetic accelerator, Jessica's husband blames her for Gerry's health and divorces her. 

When Gerry emerges from the genetic accelerator, Jessica learns that her son had gained spider-like powers (superhuman strength and agility as well as the ability to organically produce webs), but he still had his disease. Teenaged Gerry uses his powers to become Spider-Man, and has several run-ins with Spider-Girl (Spider-Man's daughter). He was pushing his body beyond its limits, and Jessica asks Spider-Man to convince her son to give up his "career" as Spider-Man. Peter Parker attempts to find someone capable of finding a cure to Gerry's disease, and apparently succeeds (at least that is suggested in the Spider-Girl series).

What If...?
In What If...? #17, which is set during the events of Marvel Spotlight #32, Jessica succeeded in killing Nick Fury after the accidental death of Jared. She escaped and came back to HYDRA headquarters but was pursued by S.H.I.E.L.D. Agents led by agent Valentina Allegra de Fontaine. Spider-Woman (still known as Arachne) became a supervillain who wanted to know her real origin, just like Earth-616 version. Count Otto Vermis is still alive but captured by S.H.I.E.L.D. and Agent Val chase Arachne to get revenge for Fury's death. This parallel universe is known as Earth-79101.

Spider-Verse
During the Spider-Verse storyline, the Earth-001 version of Jessica Drew is a servant of the Inheritors. She was sent to pick up the wine from Robbie Robertson's import company which is needed for the feast that the Inheritors will be having. Spider-Woman of Earth-616 met her counterpart while in Earth-001. She and Morlun are in relationship in which Bora describes her as "...one of Morlun's toys".

Ultimate Marvel

The Ultimate Marvel incarnation of Jessica Drew, known as Spider-Woman primarily and the Black Widow for a time, has been an agent of SHIELD, a member of the Ultimates and New Ultimates, and a supporting character for both Peter Parker and Miles Morales. A clone of the former, she has heightened agility, strength, reflexes, a precognitive danger sense (spider sense), the ability to stick to walls, and organic webbing she can shoot from her fingertips.
In other media
Television
Jessica Drew / Spider-Woman appears in a self-titled TV series, voiced by Joan Van Ark.

Film
 Jessica Drew / Spider-Woman will appear in a female-centered spin-off to the 2018 animated film Spider-Man: Into the Spider-Verse. 
 Jessica Drew / Spider-Woman will appear in Spider-Man: Across the Spider-Verse, voiced by Issa Rae. This version is a pregnant African American who rides a motorcycle.

Video games
 Jessica Drew / Spider-Woman appears as a playable character in Marvel Ultimate Alliance, voiced by Tasia Valenza. This version lacks her comic book counterpart's super-strength.
 Jessica Drew / Spider-Woman appears as a boss and assist character in the PlayStation 2 and PlayStation Portable versions of Spider-Man: Web of Shadows, voiced by Mary Elizabeth McGlynn.
 Jessica Drew / Spider-Woman appears in Marvel Ultimate Alliance 2, voiced by E. G. Daily. This version is allied with Captain America's Anti-Registration movement and assists players before being captured by S.H.I.E.L.D. agents. She also serves as a boss for the Pro-Registration campaign.
 Jessica Drew / Spider-Woman appears as an unlockable playable character in Marvel Super Hero Squad Online, voiced by Grey DeLisle.
 Jessica Drew / Spider-Woman appears as an unlockable playable character in Marvel Avengers Alliance. Spider-Woman later appears as one of the Serpent's Worthy, Kurth, Breaker of Stones.
 Jessica Drew / Spider-Woman appears as an unlockable playable character in Marvel Heroes.
 Jessica Drew / Spider-Woman appears as an unlockable playable character in Lego Marvel Super Heroes, voiced by Kari Wahlgren.
 Multiple incarnations of Jessica Drew appear as unlockable playable characters in Spider-Man Unlimited, voiced by Laura Bailey.
 Jessica Drew / Spider-Woman appears in Marvel Pinball, as part of the "Women of Power" DLC pack and the A-Force table.
 Jessica Drew / Spider-Woman appears as an unlockable playable character in Marvel Avengers Academy, voiced by Kiernan Shipka.
 Jessica Drew / Spider-Woman appears as an unlockable playable character in Marvel: Avengers Alliance 2.
 Jessica Drew / Spider-Woman appears as an unlockable playable character in Marvel Puzzle Quest.
 Jessica Drew / Spider-Woman appears an unlockable playable character in Marvel Future Fight.
 Jessica Drew / Spider-Woman appears in Marvel Snap''.

Collected editions

See also
 Julia Carpenter/Spider-Woman/Arachne/Madame Web
 Mattie Franklin

References

External links

 
 
 Spider-Woman (Jessica Drew) at Spiderfan.org
 

1978 comics debuts
Avengers (comics) characters
British superheroes
Characters created by Archie Goodwin (comics)
Characters created by Marie Severin
Comics characters introduced in 1977
Fictional capoeira practitioners
Fictional characters with electric or magnetic abilities
Fictional characters with superhuman durability or invulnerability
Fictional cryonically preserved characters in comics
Fictional double agents
Fictional immigrants to the United States
Fictional people from London
Fictional private investigators
Fictional SIS agents
Hydra (comics) agents
Marvel Comics American superheroes
Marvel Comics characters who can move at superhuman speeds
Marvel Comics characters with superhuman strength
Marvel Comics female superheroes
Marvel Comics martial artists
Marvel Comics military personnel
Marvel Comics mutates
Marvel Comics titles
S.H.I.E.L.D. agents
Spider-Woman